Pristimantis croceoinguinis is a species of frog in the family Strabomantidae. It is found in the lowland Amazon rainforest of southern Colombia, eastern Ecuador, and extreme north-eastern Peru, likely also extending into the adjacent Brazil. The specific name croceoinguinis refers to the color of the  spots of this frog. Common name Santa Cecilia robber frog has been proposed for it.

Description
Adult males measure  and adult females  in snout–vent length. The snout is subacuminate in dorsal view and round in lateral profile. The tympanum is hidden beneath skin. The finger tips bear discs but no lateral fringes. The toe discs are slightly smaller than those of the fingers; no lateral fringes nor webbing is present. Skin is dorsally pustulate. The dorsum is yellow-brown to brown, with dark brown spotting and white or yellow flecks. The sides are brown to black, blotched with darker brown and flecked with white or yellow. There are two yellow to reddish-orange spots on each side in groin. The venter is gray to black but usually brown and has cream flecks. The have dark brown bars on paler brown background. An anal triangle is similarly brown.

Habitat and conservation
It can also be found in lightly disturbed habitats. Development is presumably direct (i.e, there is no free-living larval stage).

This species can be locally threatened by human activities such as collection of wood, logging, agriculture, and settlements, but overall, it is not facing major threats. Large areas of suitable habitat remain, and it is also present in a number of protected areas.

References

croceoinguinis
Amphibians of Colombia
Amphibians of Ecuador
Amphibians of Peru
Amphibians described in 1968
Taxa named by John Douglas Lynch
Taxonomy articles created by Polbot